Hornsea Rail Trail is a public footpath, cycleway and bridleway which follows the route of the old Hull and Hornsea Railway in the East Riding of Yorkshire, England. It forms the eastern part of the Trans Pennine Trail.

Coordinates

Notes

References

External links

East Riding of Yorkshire Council route description

Transport in the East Riding of Yorkshire
Rail trails in England
Footpaths in the East Riding of Yorkshire
Hornsea